Lewis Green Stevenson (August 15, 1868 – April 5, 1929) was an American politician. He was the Illinois Secretary of State from 1914 to 1917 and a member of Illinois' political Stevenson family.

Early life
Born in Chenoa, Illinois, Stevenson was educated in the Bloomington public schools, at Phillips Exeter Academy, and at Illinois State Normal University (now Illinois State University). He died of a heart ailment, at his home, in Bloomington, Illinois.

Stevenson's father, Adlai Ewing Stevenson I, was the 23rd Vice President of the United States from 1893 to 1897. Stevenson's son, Adlai Ewing Stevenson II, was the Governor of Illinois, the Democratic candidate for President of the United States in 1952 and 1956 and later the United States Ambassador to the United Nations. His grandson, Adlai Ewing Stevenson III, was a U.S. senator from Illinois. The actor McLean Stevenson was his first cousin twice removed.

Marriage and issue

Lewis Stevenson married Helen Louise Davis, daughter of Pantagraph publisher W. O. Davis and granddaughter of Jesse Fell. They had two children, Elizabeth "Buffy" and Adlai Ewing Stevenson II.

Political career
Lewis followed in his father's footsteps as a Democratic Party leader. He served as his father's private secretary while his father was Vice President of the United States. Later, Lewis served as chairman of the Illinois State Board of Pardons, president of the Illinois Centennial Commission, and as Secretary of State under Governor Edward Dunne. He took an active part in the national conventions of the Democratic party and was frequently consulted on party policy.

Notes

External links
 Stevensons put stamp on history

1868 births
1929 deaths
American people of Scotch-Irish descent
Illinois Democrats
Secretaries of State of Illinois
Stevenson family
Children of vice presidents of the United States
People from Bloomington, Illinois
People from Chenoa, Illinois
Illinois State University alumni
Phillips Exeter Academy alumni
Politicians from Bloomington, Illinois